Abdul Juma Idd (born March 27, 1993) popularity known by his stage name Lava Lava is a Tanzanian singer signed under WCB Wasafi record label.

Career
Lava Lava joined Tanzania House of Talents (THT) where he learned music. Upon completion of his music study, a companion from WCB Wasafi requested that he present himself to Wasafi records and he was fortunate to be marked in. While at Wasafi records it took him two years before being uncovered to the fans. Lava Lava joined WCB Wasafi a label owned by Diamond Platnumz but was officially unveiled on May 22, 2017, by releasing a song "Tuachane".

Relationships
Lava Lava's love life is somehow private as most of his fans do not know whether or not he has a wife or at least a girlfriend. Sometimes back he did release a song titled "Single" where he narrates how his fans are on his neck on why he is single when the other musicians on his record label WCB Wasafi have companions, the likes of Mbosso, Rayvanny, Harmonize and Diamond Platnumz their leader.

There is a specific allegation by a lady named Flaviana. He was said to have been in a relationship with a Tanzanian lady named Flaviana. Through an interview with Jubon Online, which was uploaded on YouTube on  August 21, 2018, Flaviana displays a video of Lava Lava at her house drinking tea shirtless and WhatsApp chats between them. Flaviana got pregnant and claimed to the media that Lava was the one responsible for her pregnancy. However, in different media interviews, Lava Lava rubbishes the claim affirming that the lady is just searching for fame.

Discography

Albums
Promise

Singles
Saula featuring Harmonize (singer)
Warembo featuring Susumila
Niue
Gundu
Teja
Tuachane
Habibi
Jibebe featuring Mbosso and Diamond Platnumz
Hatuachani
Tukaze Roho
Utatulia
Utanipenda cover
Go gaga
Wanga
Tekenya
Corona
Bachela
Single
Nimekuchagua
Dede
Tattoo
Balaa
Ya Ramadhan
Kizungu zungu
Dondosa

References

Living people
1993 births
21st-century Tanzanian male singers